Paul Costeluș Costea (born 2 March 1999) is a Romanian professional footballer who last played for Gaz Metan Mediaș.

References

External links
 
 Paul Costea at lpf.ro

1999 births
Living people
Sportspeople from Cluj-Napoca
Romanian footballers
Association football midfielders
FC Universitatea Cluj players
Liga I players
CS Gaz Metan Mediaș players